The 2019 CS U.S. International Figure Skating Classic was held in September 2019 in Salt Lake City, Utah. It was part of the 2019–20 ISU Challenger Series. Medals were awarded in the disciplines of men's singles, ladies' singles, pair skating, and ice dance.

Entries
The International Skating Union published the list of entries on August 20, 2019.

Changes to preliminary assignments

Results

Men

Ladies

Pairs

Ice dance

References

 U.S. International Figure Skating Classic
 2019 in figure skating
 2019 in sports in Utah
 Sports in Salt Lake City
CS U.S. International